Pseudoosterella ubalaensis is an extinct ammonoid cephalopod species belonging to the genus Pseudoosterella in the family of Oosterellidae. These fast-moving nektonic carnivores lived during the Early Cretaceous; Valanginian epoch. The species was first described by Haas in 1960.

Etymology 
The species epithet is derived from Ubalá, Cundinamarca, where the species has been found. In Muysccubun, the language of the Muisca, Ubalá means "Place on the hillside" or "At the foot of the hillside".

Distribution 
Fossils of Pseudoosterella ubalaensis have been found in Valanginian black shales of the Murca Formation, belonging to the Cáqueza Group, outcropping near Ubalá, and Labranzagrande, Boyacá.

See also 

 List of flora and fauna named after the Muisca

References

Bibliography 
 
 
 

Ammonites of South America
Early Cretaceous ammonites
Valanginian species
Cretaceous Colombia
Altiplano Cundiboyacense
Ubala
Perisphinctoidea
Fossils of Colombia